The Co-Cathedral of St. Anthony of Padua  also called Békéscsaba Cathedral is the name given to a religious building located in the city of Békéscsaba, in the European country of Hungary, which was built in 1910 with a neo-Gothic style.

The temple follows the Roman or Latin rite and since 2010 serves as the Co-Cathedral or alternate cathedral of the Diocese of Szeged-Csanád. It is the second largest church in the city after a Protestant church. Its tower reaches 61 meters high.

It is under the pastoral responsibility of the bishop László Kiss-Rigó. It was dedicated to St. Anthony of Lisbon was a priest of the Franciscan Order, Portuguese preacher and theologian, venerated as a saint and Doctor of the Church by Catholicism.

See also
Roman Catholicism in Hungary
List of cathedrals in Hungary
Co-Cathedral of St. Anthony of Padua

References

Roman Catholic cathedrals in Hungary
Buildings and structures in Békéscsaba
Roman Catholic churches completed in 1910
20th-century Roman Catholic church buildings in Hungary